Who Do You Do?  was a British television comedy impressions sketch programme produced by London Weekend Television for ITV from 1972 to 1976.
Many notable impressionists/comedians appeared on the show. The format was quickfire, with many items lasting only 30 seconds. It was revived in 1985 as Copy Cats. Writers of the show included Barry Cryer and Dick Vosburgh who was also the script editor.

Featured performers
Russ Abbot
Debbie Arnold
Tony Brandon
Faith Brown
Janet Brown
Michael Barrymore
David Copperfield
Barry Cryer
Paddy Dailey
Les Dennis
Dustin Gee
Peter Goodwright
Aiden J. Harvey
Vince Hill
Billy Howard
David Jacobs
Karen Kay
Roger Kitter
Eddie Large
Syd Little
Paul Melba
Johnny More
Arthur Mullard
Lance Percival
The Rockin' Berries
Freddie Starr
Joan Turner
Bill Wayne

References

External links
 .

1972 British television series debuts
1976 British television series endings
1970s British comedy television series
British comedy television shows
ITV comedy
English-language television shows